Vayland is an unincorporated community in Hand County, in the U.S. state of South Dakota.

History
A post office called Vayland was established in 1909, and remained in operation until 1972. The community derives its name from J. C. McViegh, an early settler.

References

Unincorporated communities in Hand County, South Dakota
Unincorporated communities in South Dakota